The filmography of English actor David Morrissey encompasses acting, directing, producing, and screenwriting roles in film, television, and theatre for over 30 years.

Morrissey made his screen acting debut in 1983 as a main cast member in Willy Russell's One Summer. Since then he has appeared notably in The Knock (1994), Tony Marchant's Holding On (1997), Andrew Davies's Our Mutual Friend (1998), Paul Abbott's State of Play and Peter Morgan's The Deal (both 2003), Peter Bowker's Blackpool (2004), and Andrew Davies' Sense and Sensibility (2008). In 2010, he produced and starred in Thorne, a television adaptation of Mark Billingham's Tom Thorne novels for Sky 1. In film he has appeared in Hilary and Jackie (1998), Some Voices (2000), Derailed (2005), Basic Instinct 2 (2006), and The Reaping (2007).

On stage, after a period working with the Royal Shakespeare Company and the National, he appeared in Peer Gynt (1990), Much Ado About Nothing (1993), Three Days of Rain (1999), In a Dark Dark House (2008) and Hangmen (2015) by Martin McDonagh.

He was nominated for a British Academy Television Award for Best Actor for his role in State of Play, was nominated for a Royal Television Society Award for Best Male Actor for his role in Holding On, and won the RTS Award for his role in The Deal.

Acting

Television

Film

Stage

Radio

Narration

Filmmaking

Footnotes

References

External links
"David Morrissey". Internet Movie Database (IMBb.com, Inc). Retrieved 17 December 2008.

Male actor filmographies
Director filmographies
British filmographies